West Pride is a gay, lesbian, bisexual and transgender cultural festival in Gothenburg, Sweden, started in June 2007. The annual event is arranged by the Gothenburg Municipality and Västra Götaland region, in cooperation with RFSL and other LGBT organisations. It takes place at the city's foremost cultural institutions such as Gothenburg City Theatre, the Röhsska Museum and the Museum of World Culture. Gothenburg Film Festival shows queer films during the festival.

History
In 2017, the city supported the event by displaying 1,000 rainbow flags. Parade participants in 2017 carried signs urging acceptance of refugees and immigrants, and urging other European and Middle Eastern countries to accept LGBTQ people.

See also
List of LGBT film festivals

References

External links 

 West Pride - Homepage of the festival

LGBT events in Sweden
Culture in Gothenburg
LGBT film festivals
Recurring events established in 2007
2007 establishments in Sweden
LGBT festivals in Europe